Game Boy Advance Video was a format for putting full color, full-motion videos onto Game Boy Advance ROM cartridges. These videos were playable using the Game Boy Advance system's screen and sound hardware. The cartridges were all developed and published by Majesco Entertainment, while the Pokémon Game Boy Advance Video cartridges were published by Nintendo. Most cartridges were developed by DC Studios, Inc., except for the few labelled "Movie Pak" which were developed by 4Kids Entertainment's subsidiary 4Kids Technology, Inc. The video cartridges are colored white for easy identification and are sold as Game Boy Advance Video Paks. The Game Boy Advance Video game paks offer the same 240×160 resolution as standard Game Boy Advance games, except for the Shrek and Shark Tale pack, which is at 112p.

History
The product was originally announced as GBA-TV in 2003. Game Boy Advance Video Paks first became available in North America in May 2004. In June 2004, Majesco had expanded its Game Boy Advance Video licenses into other categories. They had also expanded the library to include shows from Nickelodeon, Nick Jr, Cartoon Network, and Funimation, in addition to the existing 4Kids cartridges. In November 2004, Majesco started to sell GBA Video Paks featuring several Disney Channel animated series, including Brandy & Mr. Whiskers, Kim Possible, Lilo & Stitch: The Series, and The Proud Family. In November 2005, Majesco began to sell GBA Video Paks featuring full-length animated films from DreamWorks Animation including Shrek 2 and Shark Tale. A special GBA Video Pak containing the films Shrek and Shark Tale combined into one cartridge was released in 2006.

Copy protection
Game Boy Advance Video Paks are viewable only on Game Boy Advance, Game Boy Advance SP, Game Boy Micro, Nintendo DS, and Nintendo DS Lite systems, as the owners of copyright in the television shows requested that Majesco prevent people from using the GameCube's Game Boy Player accessory to play and record the shows onto VHS tapes or DVDs. However, the low resolution and mono sound would result in a low-quality video output on a TV regardless. Unlike Sony's PlayStation 2 and Microsoft's Xbox video game consoles, the Nintendo GameCube cannot output Macrovision gain-control copy distortion signals. The GBA Video Paks perform a check when inserted into the Game Boy Player, using the same logo authentication method used by Game Boy Advance games that support controller rumble, and will freeze with the message "Not compatible with Game Boy Player" if they detect the Game Boy Player in use.

Disadvantages
Because of the low capacity of Game Boy Advance cartridges (normally ranging from 4 to 32 MB, though the video cartridges can reach sizes of 64 MB) and the length of the video content (generally feature-length movies and episodes), GBA Video Paks are heavily compressed, with visual artifacts marring nearly every frame. The image quality has a similar appearance to early Cinepak compression, and the "quilting" and color bleeding effect found in other compressed video formats is also present. The opening theme for Pokémon is also slightly shortened. Also, in cases where certain videos are available both as a 45-minute two-part episodes or a 22-minute edited version, the 22-minute version is used. The proprietary codec created by DC Studios is described in detail in the Majesco patents.

Additional information
Game Boy Advance Video Paks were the feature prize in Vol. 183 of Nintendo Power Magazine, as part of its players poll sweepstakes, in which five grand prize winners would receive a Game Boy Advance SP and twenty GBA Video Paks. Most GBA Video Paks cost US$9.95 and feature 40 to 45 minutes of video content. GBA Video Movie Paks cost US$19.99 and feature up to a 90-minute movie.

Some GBA Video Movie Paks came packaged with headphones.

List of published titles
The following titles and episodes were released in the Game Boy Advance Video:

Feature-length movies
Three feature-length movies and two compilations were released:
 Shark Tale (1:23:15) 
 Shrek (1:33:05) 
 Shrek 2 (1:32:25)
 Shrek & Shark Tale 2 movies in 1! (2:47:06) Released as a single compilation cartridge. 
 Shrek & Shrek 2 2 movies in 1! (3:05:30) Released as both individual cartridges in a single package.

All movies are rated PG by the MPA. Individual movie cartridges retain the full credits sequence with music, while on compilations, credits are text only and accelerated.

Cartoon Network

Disney Channel

Nickelodeon

The Adventures of Jimmy Neutron, Boy Genius
"Brobot"
"The Big Pinch"
"Granny Baby"
"Time is Money"

All Grown Up!
"Susie Sings the Blues"
"Coup de Ville"

Dora the Explorer
"3 Little Piggies"
"The Big River"

The Fairly OddParents Volume 1"Foul Balled"
"The Boy Who Would Be Queen"
"The Information Stupor Highway"The Fairly OddParents Volume 2"Father Time"
"Apartnership"
"Ruled Out"
"That's Life"

Pokémon

Volumes 1 and 2 consist of episodes from Pokémon: Master Quest, with one exception: "A Hot Water Battle" is from Pokémon: Johto League Champions.
Volumes 3 and 4 consist of episodes from Pokémon: Indigo League.

OthersDragon Ball GT Volume 1"A Grand Problem"
"Pan's Gambit"Lizzie McGuire 2: Lizzie Diaries Game + TV Episode
 Lizzie McGuire 2: Lizzie Diaries video game
 "You're a good man Lizzie McGuire" TV episode

Sonic X Volume 1"Chaos Control Freaks"
"Sonic to the Rescue"Strawberry Shortcake: Summertime Adventure Special Edition
 Strawberry Shortcake: Summertime Adventure video game
 "Meet Strawberry Shortcake" TV episode

Strawberry Shortcake Volume 1"Meet Strawberry Shortcake"
"Spring for Strawberry Shortcake"Super Robot Monkey Team Hyperforce Go! Volume 1"Depths of Fear"
"Planetoid Q"Teenage Mutant Ninja Turtles Volume 1"Things Change"
"A Better Mousetrap"Yu-Gi-Oh! Volume 1"Friends Until the End Part 3"
"Friends Until the End Part 4"

Cancelled titles
The following Game Boy Advance Video titles were planned, but never released to the public.Kirby: Right Back at Ya!
The episode list is unknown. Nintendo later released Kirby: Right Back at Ya! episodes on subsequent systems:
 In 2011, the Kirby TV Channel video on demand service was released for the Wii in Europe, featuring free Kirby episodes.
 In 2012, Kirby's Dream Collection was released for the Wii outside of Europe, and it included three Kirby episodes.
 Also in 2012, Nintendo released a two-part 3D episode on Nintendo Video for the Nintendo 3DS family. Upon the service being discontinued in 2015, the Kirby video was added on the Nintendo eShop. It is available as a My Nintendo reward for 100 platinum points.

Sonic X Volume 2
Episodes "Missile Wrist Rampage" and "Chaos Emerald Chaos" were planned to be released on Game Boy Advance Video.

''Teenage Mutant Ninja Turtles Volume 2The two-part episode "The Shredder Strikes" was planned to be released on Game Boy Advance Video.Yu-Gi-Oh!'' Volume 2
The two-part episode "Noah's Final Threat" was planned to be released on Game Boy Advance Video.

See also
Nintendo Video
Juice Box
VideoNow

References

Video storage
Video
Computer-related introductions in 2004
Discontinued media formats